Hünfeld is a town in the district of Fulda, in Hesse, Germany. It is situated 16 km northeast of Fulda. In 2000, the town hosted the 40th Hessentag state festival. Hünfeld has a population close to 16,000.

Infrastructure

Transport
The federal road B27 crosses Hünfeld from north to south. Eastbound B84 begins here.

The closest motorway is Autobahn A7 Flensburg - Füssen, the nearest interchange is "Hünfeld / Schlitz AS 90", 7 km distance to the town center.

Hünfeld has a railway station on the Bebra–Fulda railway. The nearest Intercity-Express stop is Fulda railway station.

The nearest international airport is Frankfurt International Airport, 140 km distance to city-center

Governance

Town twinning
Hünfeld is twinned with:
 Landerneau, Département Finistère, since 14 July 1968
 Geisa, Thuringia, since 1990
 Prószków, Opole Voivodeship, since 4 October 1997
 Steinberg, Saxony,

Notable people
 Wilm Hosenfeld (1895–1952)
 Johann Leonhard Pfaff (1775–1848), bishop of Fulda
 Franz Maria Liedig (1900–1967)
 Konrad Zuse (1910–1995)
 Paul Frielinghaus (1959)
 Vincenz Blanquett (1988), German teacher

Festivals
 Rhön Rock Open Air, in Hünfeld-Oberfeld (in August)

See also
 Fulda Gap

External links 

 Municipal website
 Brochure of Hünfeld (in English)
 Konrad-Zuse-Museum Hünfeld (in German)

References 

Fulda (district)